Chinese Whispers: The True Story Behind Britain's Hidden Army of Labour is a non-fiction book by UK-based journalist and author Hsiao-Hung Pai, first published in 2008. It is about the lives of migrant workers from China in the UK. The book was shortlisted for the 2009 Orwell Prize and reviewed by The Wall Street Journal. To research the book, Pai went undercover.

See also
History of Chinese immigration to the United Kingdom

References

External links
 Reviews – via hsiao-hung.com

2008 non-fiction books
Non-fiction books about immigration to Europe
Penguin Books books